The Scandinavian America Line (Skandinavien-Amerika-Linien) was founded in 1898, when Det Forenede Dampskibs-Selskap (DFDS) took over the steamship company Thingvalla Line.  The passenger and freight service between Scandinavia and New York City was operated under the name Scandinavian America Line until 1935.

Fleet

One of the ships in the Scandinavian American Line was the SS United States.  This ship was constructed in 1903 by A. Stephen and Sons in Glasgow.  She was 10,095 tons and 500.8 feet long.  Her captain was Captain Wulff.   The United States made her maiden voyage on March 30, 1903; she sailed from Copenhagen to Christiana (present-day Oslo), Christiansand then on to New York by June 3, 1903.  The United States left from Copenhagen on her last voyage on October 25, 1934.  She was damaged by a fire on September 2, 1935 at Copenhagen and was scrapped that same year in Leghorn.

In November 1935 the ship SS Frederik VIII sailed the Scandinavian America Line's final voyage from New York to Copenhagen.  The ship was scrapped in 1936.  After that time, cargo and passenger service continued under DFDS's own name.

List of ships
 Hekla, 1884-1898, taken over with Thingvalla Line, 1905 sold to Danish owners, renamed Eduard Regel. 3,258
 Thingvalla, 1874-1898, taken over with Thingvalla Line, 1900 sold to Norway. 2,524
 Norge, 1881-1898, taken over with Thingvalla Line, 1904 wrecked near Rockall, 620 lives lost. 3,310
 Island, 1882-1898, taken over with Thingvalla Line, 1906 scrapped. 2,844
 Oscar II, 1901-1933 scrapped. 9,956
 Hellig Olav, 1903-1934 scrapped. 10,085
 United States, 1903-1935 damaged by fire at Copenhagen and scrapped. 10,095
 C.F. Tietgen, 1897, ex- Rotterdam, 1906 purchased from Holland America Line and renamed C.F. Tietgen, 1913 sold to Russian American Line, renamed Dwinsk. 8,173
 Frederik VIII, 1914-1936 scrapped.

Legacy
Amerikakaj (America Quay) is the name of the quay in the former Free Port of Copenhagen from where the America liners departed. Scandinavian America Line's sales office in Copenhagen was based at Nyhavn 1.

See also 

 Captain Johan Wilhelm Hempel
 Hamburg America Line
 Holland America Line
 Norwegian America Line
 Swedish American Line

References

External links
 Skandinavien Amerika Linien / Scandinavian American Line Passenger Lists GG Archives
 
 
Scandinavian-American Line History and Ephemera GG Archives

Shipping companies of Denmark
Danish companies established in 1898
Transatlantic shipping companies